Arnett is an unincorporated community located in Owsley County, Kentucky, United States. Its post office closed in February 1957.

References

Unincorporated communities in Owsley County, Kentucky
Unincorporated communities in Kentucky